The Best Movie (Samy luchshiy film) is a 2008 Russian comedy film from TNT and Comedy Club Russia, spoofing such famous Russian films as Night Watch and Day Watch, The 9th Company, Heat and TV series: My Fair Nanny, Dalnoboyshchiki and Brigada. The movie includes numerous cameos by Russian celebrities, some of them involving a humorous touch on their public image. For instance, socialite Kseniya Sobchak appears as a luxury prostitute, and gay icon Boris Moiseev plays a rough-and-tumble policeman, his only line being: "You gonna sign it all, you faggot!"

Plot
Vadik Volnov (Garik Kharlamov) dies on his own wedding of cannabis overdose and has to prove to God that he is worthy to enter Heaven. During his conversation with God's secretary, Vadik recalls numerous memorable moments of his earthly existence, such as getting drunk on cognac on his 8th birthday, service in the Soviet Army in Afghanistan, bandit showdowns in crime-ridden 1990s Russia, and, finally, meeting the love of his life.

Cast
 Garic Kharlamov — Vadik
 Mikhail Galustyan — Polkilo
 Elena Velikanova — Nastya
 Armen Dzhigarkhanyan — God's secretary
 Pavel Volya — Tima Milan (parody of Dima Bilan)
 Valery Barinov — Nastya's father
 Iosif Buyanovsky — Lyalya
 Dmitry Nagiev — Drill Sergeant
 Dmitry Sychyov — Himself
 Boris Moiseev — Mаjor

Box office
Supported by an omnipresent marketing campaign, the film grossed 403 Mil. roubles on its opening weekend in Russia. From Russia and the CIS combined, it earned $16.5 million, breaking the opening-weekend record. This record was first surpassed by Avatar, although the film still holds the opening-weekend record for Russian films.

Sequels
The film was followed by the sequels The Best Movie 2 and The Best Movie 3.

External links

References

2000s Russian-language films
2008 films
2000s crime comedy films
2008 black comedy films
Russian crime comedy films
Russian parody films
Russian black comedy films
Gangster films
Slapstick films
2000s parody films
Russian sex comedy films
Films set in the 1990s
Films set in the 2000s
2008 comedy films